Marc S. Seigar is an astrophysicist, academic and author. He is the Dean of the College of Natural Sciences and Mathematics, and a Professor of Physics and Astronomy at the University of Toledo.

Seigar has published over 140 articles on topics related to galaxy structure and dynamics, galaxy morphology, and spiral structure. He is the author of 2 books entitled Dark Matter in the Universe and Spiral Structure in Galaxies, and has edited a volume on Structure and Dynamics of Disk Galaxies.

Seigar is a member of several professional societies, including Sigma Xi, the International Astronomical Union, the American Astronomical Society, and the Royal Astronomical Society. He is also an Associate of the Royal College of Science. He serves on the editorial board of the journal “Universe”, and is the member of International Astronomical Union’s Executive Committee on Astronomy for Equity and Inclusion. He has conducted numerous invited talks.

Education 
Seigar graduated from Imperial College, London in 1993 with a Bachelor of Science in Physics. He then enrolled at Liverpool John Moores University, and earned his Doctoral degree in Astrophysics in 1998 from the Astrophysics Research Institute. His dissertation “Observational Studies of the Structure of Spiral Galaxies”, was supervised by Philip A. James.

Career 
Following his Doctoral degree, Seigar held concurrent appointments as a Postdoctoral Research Fellow at the University of Ghent, and as a Visiting Astronomer at the Space Telescope Science Institute until 2001. He held his next appointment as a Staff Astronomer for the U.K. Infrared Telescope (UKIRT) at the Joint Astronomy Centre from 2001 until 2004. During this time period, he was also concurrently appointed by the University of Hawaii at Hilo as an Adjunct Professor of Physics and Astronomy for a year. From 2004 to 2007, he served as an Assistant Project Scientist at the University of California, Irvine, and as Visiting Astronomer at the Observatories of the Carnegie Institution for Science. In 2007, he held joint appointments as an adjunct professor at the University of Arkansas, Fayetteville, and as Assistant Professor of Physics and Astronomy at University of Arkansas at Little Rock, where he worked his way through the academic ranks. In 2014, he joined the University of Minnesota Duluth as a Professor of Physics and Astronomy, and served there until 2021. Currently, he holds appointment as a professor in the Department of Physics and Astronomy at the University of Toledo.

Seigar also held administrative appointments in his career. He was appointed as head of the Department of Physics and Astronomy at the University of Minnesota Duluth from 2014 until 2017, and as associate dean at Swenson College of Science and Engineering from 2017 until 2020. He also held an appointment as a Program Director in the Division of Astronomical Sciences at National Science Foundation for a year. As of 2021, he is the dean of the College of Natural Sciences and Mathematics at the University of Toledo.

Research 
Seigar’s research primarily focuses on the structure, morphology and dynamics of galaxies, as well as their dark matter halos and the nature of the dark matter particles.

Astronomical databases 
Seigar has been involved in several database projects. The first of these is the H-alpha Galaxy Survey (HaGS). HaGS was focused on the selection and observations of 334 galaxies, and found that a correlation exists between total star formation rate and Hubble type, with the strongest star formation in isolated galaxies occurring in Sc and Sbc types. Seigar was also a member of the 850-μm SCUBA Half-Degree Extragalactic Survey (SHADES) which presented maps, source catalogues and number counts of the largest extragalactic submillimetre survey at that time. This survey found out that a 850-μm survey complete down to 2 mJy would resolve 20–30 per cent of the far-infrared background into point sources. In the SHADES paper published in 2007, the team presented a comparison between redshift distributions of sub-mm galaxy formation and evolution models, as well as described the contribution of these SHADES sources and the general sub-mm galaxy population in terms of the star formation rate density at different epochs.

Supermassive black holes 
Seigar has developed several methods to estimate supermassive black hole (SMBH) masses. His research team works extensively to develop SMBH mass function, and to provide direct determinations of SMBH masses for nearby galaxies. In 2014, they provided nuclear supermassive black hole (SMBH) mass function for spiral galaxies in the local universe, established from a volume-limited sample consisting of a statistically complete collection of the brightest spiral galaxies in the southern (δ < 0°) hemisphere. He, along with his team, also demonstrated the relationship between spiral arm pitch angle and the mass of supermassive black holes (BHs) in the context of the nuclei of disk galaxies.

Seigar and his team also studied the spiral arm morphology of a sample of the local spiral galaxies in the Illustris simulation, and showed that SMBH mass is related to the total dark matter mass in galaxies. They explored tight correlations that exist between supermassive black hole masses and large-scale properties of the host galaxy, as well as described how halo properties determine those of a disc galaxy and its supermassive black hole. Since 2021, he has focused his research towards finding the evidences regarding the existence of Intermediate-Mass Black Holes (IMBHs) using X-ray and optical images of galaxies.

Dark matter in galaxies 
Seigar provided a cosmologically motivated description of the dark matter halo profile for the low surface brightness galaxy, Malin 1. He further found out that the dark matter halo model of Malin 1 can best be described by a halo profile that has undergone adiabatic contraction. In his paper published in 2014, he investigated the usage of spiral arm pitch angles as a probe of disk galaxy mass profiles, as well as discussed the implications regarding the suggested link between supermassive black hole (SMBH) mass and dark halo concentration. He discussed the implications of the Andromeda Galaxy (M31) in terms of testing several ideas of galaxy formation. His research work shows that the rotation curve of Andromeda Galaxy (M31) can only be produced with a mass model that includes a halo that has contracted adiabatically.

Awards and honors 
 1993 - Awarded Associate of the Royal College of Science
 1993– 1998 - Graduate Fellowship, Particle Physics and Astronomy Research Council
 2004 - Outreach Volunteer of the Year, Mauna Kea Observatories
 2004 - Inaugural Hoku Outreach Award, Mauna Kea Observatories
 2004–2007 - Gary McCue Fellowship, University of California, Irvine
 2007 - Elected Fellow, Royal Astronomical Society
 2013 - Full member, Sigma Xi

Bibliography

Books

Selected articles 
 Mutlu-Pakdil, B., Seigar, M. S., Hewitt, I. B., Treuthardt, P., Berrier, J. C., & Koval, L. E. (2019). The Illustris Simulation: Supermassive Black Hole - Galaxy Connection Beyond the Bulge. Monthly Notices of the Royal Astronomical Society, 474(2), 2594-2606.
 Mutlu-Pakdil, B., Mangedarage, M., Seigar, M. S., & Treuthardt. (2017). A Photometric Study of the Peculiar and Potentially Double Ringed, Nonbarred Galaxy: PGC 1000714. Monthly Notices of the Royal Astronomical Society, 466(1), 355-368. 
 Ho, L. C., Li, Z.-Y., Barth, A. J., Seigar, M. S., & Peng, C. Y. (2011). The Carnegie-Irvine Nearby Galaxy Survey. I. Overview and Atlas of Optical Images. The Astrophysical Journal Supplement, 197(1), 21.
 Seigar, M. S., Kennefick, D., Kennefick, J., & Lacy, C. H. S. (2008). Discovery of a Relationship Between Spiral Arm Morphology and Supermassive Black Hole Mass in Disk Galaxies. The Astrophysical Journal Letters, 678(1), L93-L96.
 Seigar, M. S., & James, P. A. (2002). A Test of Arm-Induced Star Formation in Spiral Galaxies from Near-IR and H-alpha Imaging. Monthly Notices of the Royal Astronomical Society, 337(3), 1113-1117.

References 

Year of birth missing (living people)
Living people
Alumni of Imperial College London
Fellows of the Royal Astronomical Society
Alumni of Liverpool John Moores University